General Savio is a station on the Buenos Aires Premetro. The station is on the branch that terminates at General Savio station. It was opened on 29 April 1987 together with the other Premetro stations. The station is located between the Barrios of Villa Lugano and Villa Riachuelo, near the Autódromo Juan y Oscar Gálvez. It is the terminal station on this branch of the Premetro.

From here passengers may transfer to the Metrobus Sur BRT line.

References

External links 

Buenos Aires PreMetro stations
Buenos Aires Underground stations
Railway stations opened in 1987